Sir George Robert Tyler, 1st Baronet (26 August 1835 – 26 November 1897) was a baronet and Lord Mayor of London.

Career
Tyler was a founder of the firm of Venables, Tyler and Son, papermakers of 17 Queenhithe. 
He was a councilman and  alderman from 1887 to his death, a Sheriff of London for 1891–2, and Lord Mayor of London for 1893–4. After a state visit to Antwerp they named a street Rue lord mayor Tyler in his honour. He was Master of the Stationers' Company for 1893–4. He was made  a baronet, of Queenhithe, in 1894.

Death
He died at his home at Earls Court and was buried at West Norwood Cemetery.

See also
 List of Lord Mayors of London

References
Modern English Biography, edited by Boase

1835 births
1897 deaths
Sheriffs of the City of London
19th-century lord mayors of London
19th-century English politicians
Baronets in the Baronetage of the United Kingdom
Burials at West Norwood Cemetery